In France, a pays is an area whose inhabitants share common geographical, economic, cultural, or social interests, who have a right to enter into communal planning contracts under a law known as the Loi Pasqua or LOADT (Loi d'Orientation pour l'Aménagement et le Développement du Territoire), which took effect on February 4, 1995.

It was augmented on June 25, 1999, by the Loi Voynet or LOADDT (Loi d'Orientation de l'Aménagement Durable du Territoire).  The LOADDT enables the citizens of a community to form a legally recognized pays after deciding to do so by mutual consent; its aim is to help bring the inhabitants of urban and neighboring rural districts into dialogue and agreement.

The Council of Development in each pays assembles together the elected officials and the economic, social, and cultural actors, and their associates, into a deliberative forum to discuss the development policies which should be followed by the community.  While the Council can give advice, submit proposals, and monitor development projects, it does not have the authority to make official decisions.

The Charter of the Pays makes it possible to fix the stakes and the objectives of the community. Few structures are recognized as pays Voynet, meaning nationwide, because the recognition criteria are sometimes far from what the pays are. Then again, several pays are recognized by the Commission Régionale d'aménagement et de développement du Territoire.

Sense of the word

In France, the contract of the Pays can be signed among the members of the pays, or between the pays and its surrounding area, the department, the region, or with the national state when the stakes are well-identified.

In this context, the French term pays is not used in the modern sense of "country" but preserves the original meaning of the Latin word from which it was derived, pagus, which designated the territory controlled by a medieval count.  The majority of pays are roughly coextensive with the old counties (e.g., county of Comminges, county of Ponthieu, etc). Today Pays de France still refers to a tiny area in northwest Ile-de-France, hence city names such as Roissy-en-France or Tremblay-en-France.

Although this word is frequently translated into English as country, its usage can mean a region or territory of a nation (bounded by borders and constituting a geographical entity) considered from the point of view of a certain identity or community of interest of its inhabitants. However, this usage is also sometimes found in English word country , for example for the constituent countries of the United Kingdom. It is held to be the geographical basis of the state. The word is also used less precisely as an alternative for état (state).

Pays of Brittany
Brittany, consisting of 4 departments, is also subdivided into 21 pays.

 pays de Brest
 pays de Cornouaille
 pays du Centre-Ouest de Bretagne
 pays de Morlaix
 Pays de Trégor-Goélo
 pays de Guingamp
 pays de Saint-Brieuc
 pays de Centre-Bretagne
 pays de Pontivy
 pays de Lorient
 pays d'Auray
 pays de Vannes
 pays de Ploërmel-Coeur de Bretagne
 pays de Brocéliande
 pays de Dinan
 pays de Saint-Malo
 pays de Fougères
 pays de Rennes
 Pays de Vitré-Porte de Bretagne
 pays es Vallons de Vilaine
 pays de Redon et Vilaine, note this pays straddles 3 departments, including one located outside Brittany, the Loire Atlantique.

Pays of Franche-Comté
La Franche-Comté, consisting of 4 departments, is also subdivided into 16 pays :
 pays de l'Aire Urbaine (Belfort-Montbéliard-Héricourt-Delle )
 pays du Doubs Central
 pays du Haut-Doubs
 pays Horloger
 pays de Loue Lison
 pays de Pierrefontaine Les Varans
 pays des Vosges Saônoises
 pays Dolois
 pays du Haut Revermont
 pays de la Haute Vallée de l'Ain
 pays des Lacs et de Petite Montagne
 pays Lédonien
 pays du Haut Jura
 pays Graylois
 pays des Sept Rivières
 pays de Vesoul et du Val de Saône

See also
Pays d'outre mer
Pays-d'en-Haut (disambiguation)
Pays des Illinois

References

Politics of France
Government of France
Former subdivisions of France
Geographical, historical and cultural regions of France